The Everun Note is a subnotebook / netbook computer designed by Raon Digital. At the time of its introduction, it was noted for the performance of its Turion 64 X2 dual core processor, getting high scores in benchmark testing. The Everun Note is also noted for being particularly small, given the relatively high resolution of the screen (1024x600 pixels) and taking the approach of using a touch screen instead of the touchpad that is commonly found on budget netbooks.

Retailers in the U.S. are offering the Linux model pre-installed with an unspecified Ubuntu release.

External links 
 Manufacturer's Website
 Everun Note Information and Support
 Forum (Appointed by Manufacturer)

References

Subnotebooks
Netbooks